
Year 832 (DCCCXXXII) was a leap year starting on Monday (link will display the full calendar) of the Julian calendar, the 832nd year of the Common Era (CE) and Anno Domini (AD) designations, the 832nd year of the 1st millennium, the 32nd year of the 9th century, and the 3rd year of the 830s decade.

Events 
 By place 

 Byzantine Empire 
 Byzantine–Arab War: The Byzantine fortress of Loulon (modern Turkey) is captured by the Abbasids. Its garrison surrenders to Caliph Al-Ma'mun, after a lengthy siege.

 Europe 
 King Pepin I of Aquitaine, and his brother Louis the German, revolt against their father, Emperor Louis the Pious. They gather an army of Slav allies and conquer Swabia.
 Berengar the Wise, count (or duke) of Toulouse, attacks the Frankish domains of Bernard of Septimania, taking Roussillon (along with Vallespir, Razès, and Conflent).

 Britain and Ireland 
 The Flag of Scotland: According to legend, King Óengus II of Fortriu leads an army of Picts and Scots, against the invading Angles from Northumbria, near Athelstaneford. 
 The town of Clondalkin (modern Ireland) is sacked by Vikings from Denmark, and the monastery is burnt to the ground.

 By topic 
 Religion 
 Emperor Theophilos promulgates a new edict against the usage of icons in the Byzantine Empire. He establishes strict punishments against idolators, and persecutes violators.
 The second St. Mark's Basilica in Venice (replacing an older church at a different location) is built, and becomes one of the best known examples of Italo-Byzantine architecture.

Births 
 Guanxiu, Chinese Buddhist monk and poet (d. 912)
 Isaac Judaeus, Arab Jewish physician (approximate date)

Deaths 
 March 24 – Wulfred, archbishop of Canterbury
 August 30 – Cui Qun, chancellor of the Tang Dynasty (b. 772)
 Feologild, archbishop of Canterbury
 Sico of Benevento, Lombard prince
 Xue Ping, general of the Tang Dynasty
 Zhao Zongru, chancellor of the Tang Dynasty (b. 746)
 Xue Tao, Chinese poet (b. 768)

References

Sources